Percy West Kent (1897 – after 1920) was an English professional footballer who played as a winger.

References

1897 births
Footballers from Grimsby
English footballers
Association football wingers
Blackpool F.C. players
Grimsby Town F.C. players
English Football League players
Year of death missing